The Caernarfonshire flag is the flag of the historic Welsh county of Caernarfon. The origins of the emblem of the three eagles arranged in fess on a green field revolve around the ancient King of Gwynedd, Owain Gwynedd, to whom the symbol was attributed as his coat of arms. It was registered with the Flag Institute in March 2012.



History
Owain Gwynedd was born around 1100 and became King of Gwynedd in 1137. In 1415, the Battle of Agincourt was fought in which the Caernarfonshire units were reputed to have fought under a banner of three golden eagles on green in honour of Owain Gwynedd. Michael Drayton records this in his work The Battaile of Agincourt in 1627.

In his 1920 work on county identities Story of the Shire, Frederick Hackwood calls the three golden eagles of Caernarfonshire as an "authentic" and "significant" badge of the county, as well as reciting their association to the Romans of antiquity.

Design
The colours for the flag are:

External links
[ Flag Institute – Caernarfonshire]
The Caernarfonshire Association – The Flag of Caernarfonshire

References

Flag
Flags of places in Wales
Flags introduced in 2012
Caernarfonshire